"Pennies from Heaven" is a song by American electronic music group Inner City, released in 1992 as the third single from their fourth album, Praise (1992). Despite the title, it is not a cover of the 1936 song of the same name. It became the duo's fifth and final number-one single on the US Billboard Hot Dance Club Play chart, reaching the top of the chart in August 1992 for two weeks. In the UK, it peaked at number 24 on the UK Singles Chart, while reaching number two on the UK Dance Singles Chart. British magazine Mixmag ranked it number 62 in its "100 Greatest Dance Singles Of All Time" list in 1996.

Critical reception
Larry Flick from Billboard wrote, "After teasing U.S. club DJs with several tasty imports over the past few months, Detroit duo finally unleashes this slammin' deep houser domestically. Paris Grey is in fine voice, rising above a textured arrangement that's lightly shaded with techno nuances. A major hit in the offing." A writer from Mixmag described it as a "beautiful, joyous hymn to universal love and peace." Dele Fadele from New Musical Express found that "Paris Grey's spirited vocal and the Utopian sentiment save "Pennies from Heaven" from the doldrums. You'll be saying your 'Hallelujahs' when a serious Gospel element creeps into the latter half of the 'Tunnel Mix Edit' while pop-haters search out the rare club mixes." Andy Beevers from Music Week named the song Pick of the Week in the category of Dance, complimenting its "irresistible combination of banging beats and soulful vocals".

Music video
The accompanying music video for the song featured people from all walks of life being invited by the duo for what will be a final meal, which at the end of the video resembled a portrait of The Last Supper.

Impact and legacy
British dance music record producer and DJ Mark Moore picked "Pennies from Heaven" as one of his favourites in 1995, saying, "Inner City are one of my favourite bands. This record never fails to move me with Paris Gray's vocals, brilliant piano and the message. It's really uplifting and uniting." 

British magazine Mixmag ranked the song number 62 in its "100 Greatest Dance Singles Of All Time" list in 1996.

Charts

See also
 List of number-one dance singles of 1992 (U.S.)

References

External links
Music video from YouTube

1992 songs
1992 singles
Inner City (band) songs
Virgin Records singles
House music songs
Songs written by Kevin Saunderson
Songs written by Paris Grey